The 1975 Humboldt State Lumberjacks football team represented Humboldt State University during the 1975 NCAA Division II football season. Humboldt State competed in the Far Western Conference (FWC).

The 1975 Lumberjacks were led by head coach Bud Van Deren in his 10th season. They played home games at the Redwood Bowl in Arcata, California. Humboldt State finished with a record of seven wins and three losses (7–3, 4–1 FWC). The Lumberjacks outscored their opponents 240–156 for the season.

Schedule

Team players in the NFL
No Humboldt State players were selected in the 1976 NFL Draft.

The following finished their college career in 1975, were not drafted, but played in the NFL.

Notes

References

Humboldt State
Humboldt State Lumberjacks football seasons
Humboldt State Lumberjacks football